Jungle is a genre of dance music that developed out of the UK rave scene and sound system culture in the 1990s. Emerging from breakbeat hardcore, the style is characterised by rapid breakbeats, heavily syncopated percussive loops, samples, and synthesised effects, combined with the deep basslines, melodies, and vocal samples found in dub, reggae and dancehall, as well as hip hop and funk. Many producers frequently sampled the "Amen break" or other breakbeats from funk and jazz recordings. Jungle was a direct precursor to the drum and bass genre which emerged in the mid-1990s.

Origin
The breakbeat hardcore scene of the early 1990s was beginning to fragment by 1992/1993, with different influences becoming less common together in tracks. The piano and uplifting vocal style that was prevalent in breakbeat hardcore started to lay down the foundations of 4-beat/happy hardcore, whilst tracks with dark-themed samples and industrial style stabs had emerged from late 1992 and named darkcore. Reggae samples and reggae influenced tracks had been a feature of many breakbeat hardcore tracks since 1990 particularly from producers such as Shut Up and Dance, however Ibiza Records, and the Rebel MC were arguably the first to bring the sound system influence solidly into releases. The track "We Are I.E." by Lennie De-Ice is often credited as being the track that laid down the foundations for jungle with its ragga bassline.

During 1992 and 1993, the phrases "jungle techno" and "hardcore jungle" proliferated to describe that shift of the music from breakbeat hardcore to jungle. The sound was championed at clubs such as A.W.O.L., Roast, and Telepathy, by DJs such as DJ Ron, DJ Hype, Mickey Finn, DJ Rap, DJ Dextrous, and Kenny Ken, record labels Moving Shadow, V Recordings, Suburban Base, and Renk, and on pirate radio stations such as Kool FM (regarded as being the most instrumental station in the development of jungle) but also Don FM, Rush, and Rude FM.

Tracks would span breakbeat styles, particularly with darkcore, with notable releases including "Darkage" by DJ Solo, "Valley of the Shadows" by Origin Unknown, "Set Me Free" by Potential Bad Boy, "28 Gun Bad Boy" by A Guy Called Gerald, "Crackman" by DJ Ron, "A London Sumtin" by Code 071, "Learning from My Brother" by Family of Intelligence, "Lion of Judah" by X Project, and "Be Free" by Noise Factory.

Techniques and styles could be traced to such a vast group of influencers, each adding their own little elements. According to Simon Reynolds, jungle was like: "Britain's very own equivalent to US hip-hop. That said, you could equally make the case that jungle is a raved-up, digitised offshoot of Jamaican reggae. Musically, Jungle's spatialised production, bass quake pressure and battery of extreme sonic effects, make it a sort of postmodern dub music on steroids." This is an example of the effects of the sonic diaspora and the wide influence musical genres have; Jungle is where these different Black Atlantic genres converge. Reynolds noted the audience of the genre evolved alongside the music itself; going from a "sweaty, shirtless white teenager, grinning and gurning" to a "head nodding, stylishly dressed black twenty something with hooded-eyes, holding a spliff in one hand and a bottle of champagne in the other." Jungle also served as "a site for a battle between contesting notions of blackness".

Rise and popularity

Jungle reached the peak of its popularity in 1994/1995. At this stage, the genre was spawning a number of UK top 40 hits, most notably "Incredible" by M-Beat featuring General Levy, and spawned a series of CD compilations such as Jungle Mania and Jungle Hits. A controversy raged over the success of "Incredible" when Levy reportedly made comments in the media that he was "running jungle at the moment". Although Levy always argued that his comments were misinterpreted, this did not fail to stop a boycott of the single amongst a group of DJs that were dubbed as the "Jungle Committee". Labels such as Ibiza, 3rd Party and Kemet were prolific in their releases.

Having previously been confined to pirate radio, legal stations woke up to jungle from 1994. London's Kiss 100 launched its Givin' It Up show in early 1994 and featured DJs such as Kenny Ken, Jumpin Jack Frost, DJ Rap, and Mickey Finn. A year later, the UK's nationwide broadcaster BBC Radio 1 finally gave jungle a platform on its One in the Jungle weekly show.

Major labels such as Sony and BMG were signing deals with artists including A Guy Called Gerald, Kemet, and DJ Ron. Of these, Roni Size and 4hero would achieve wider commercial success as drum and bass artists, but continued to release more underground jungle tracks - the latter adopting the alias Tom & Jerry to continue to release rare groove sampling dancefloor-oriented jungle. The underground classic "Burial" by Leviticus would see a major release on FFRR Records.

Jungle music, as a scene, was unable to decide whether it wanted to be recognised in the mainstream or if it wanted to avoid misrepresentation. This manifested in the cooperation of jungle artists and small record labels. Small record labels worked to provide more autonomy to the music artists in return for their business and jungle music was proliferated by pirate stations in underground networks and clubs. Whilst the media would in part feed off jungle music success, it also perpetuated negative stereotypes about the scene as being violent. The seminal 1994 documentary A London Some 'Ting Dis, chronicled the growing jungle scene and interviewed producers, DJs, and ravers to counter this perception.

1996 and 1997 saw a less reggae-influenced sound and a darker, grittier, and more sinister soundscape. Hip-hop and jazz-influenced tracks dominated the clubs in this period. Dillinja, Roni Size, Die, Hype, Zinc, Alex Reece and Krust were instrumental in the transition of the jungle sound to drum and bass. By the end of 1998, the genre's sound had changed forms significantly from the sound heard earlier in the decade.

Popular subgenres

Ragga jungle
Ragga jungle would become a major subgenre during 1994 and 1995, with popular tracks such as "Incredible" by M-Beat featuring General Levy, "Original Nuttah" by UK Apachi and Shy FX, "Sound Murderer / RIP" by Remarc, "Limb by Limb" by Hitman featuring Cutty Ranks, and "Code Red / Champion DJ" by Conquering Lion.

Jump-up
In 1995, jump-up would also become a popular subgenre which came out of hardstep, with influences of various kinds of sound experiments, most importantly the bass line. Popular tracks of this subgenre include "Dred Bass" by Dead Dred, "Super Sharp Shooter" by DJ Zinc, "This Style" by Shy FX, "R.I.P" (DJ Hype Remix) by Remarc and DJ Zinc's remix of the Fugees' "Ready or Not". The genre would later regain popularity in the early 2000s with new productions by artists such as Shimon & Andy C, Bad Company, DJ Hazard and Pendulum.

Sociocultural context
Jungle was a form of cultural expression for London's lower class urban youth. The post-Thatcherite United Kingdom of the early 1990s had left many young people disenfranchised and disillusioned with a seemingly crumbling societal structure. Jungle reflected these feelings; it was a notably more dark, less euphoric style of music than many of the other styles popular at raves. The music was much more popular with black British youths than other rave styles, such as techno,  even though it was heavily influenced by these other rave styles, including those that emerged from the United States. Jungle was also seen as "England's answer to hip-hop", with the goal of breaking down racial boundaries and promoting unification through its multiculturalism—drawing from different cultures and attracting mixed crowds at raves. Jungle's rhythm-as-melody style overturned the dominance of melody-over-rhythm in the hierarchy of Western music, adding to its radical nature.

Moreover, the greater accessibility to sampling technology allowed young people to inform music with their own sampling and experiences. Sampling technology was much more inexpensive and accessible allowing young people to work on their music in their homes rather than needing a grand recording studio. Gangsta Jungle reflects how young people were able to inform their own music. Gangsta Jungle reflects the reality of violence young Black Britons were facing. Gangsta Jungle served as an escape and as a revolutionary symbol for young Black Britains coming of age story.

Characterised by the breakbeats and multi-tiered rhythms, Jungle drew support from British b-boys who got swept up into the rave scene, but also from reggae, dancehall, electro and rap fans alike. Reynolds described it as causing fear and "for many ravers, too funky to dance" yet the club scene enjoyed every second.

Etymology
The origin of the word jungle is one of discussion. Rebel MC is often noted for having popularised the term, and in Simon Reynolds' book Energy Flash, MC Navigator is quoted as attributing the word to him. Others such as MC Five-O attribute it to MC Moose, whilst Rob Playford (of Moving Shadow) attributes it to MC Mad P (of Top Buzz). Some thought of this term as empowering, an assertion of the blackness of the music and its subculture, inverting the racist history of the term "jungle music".

Notable releases
Notable releases include: "Burial" by Leviticus, "Dangerous" by DJ Ron, "Lover to Lover / Maximum Style" by Tom & Jerry, "Original Nuttah" by Shy FX, "All the Crew Big Up" by Roni Size & DJ Die, "Incredible / Sweet Love" by M-Beat, "The Helicopter Tune" by Deep Blue, "Super Sharp Shooter" by DJ Zinc, "Sovereign Melody / Lion Heart" by Dillinja, "Everyman" by Kenny Ken, "The Victory / Lovable" by DJ Dextrous, "Bad Ass" by Aphrodite, "The Lighter" by DJ SS, and "Tiger Style" by DJ Hype.<ref>{{cite web|url=https://www.dummymag.com/10-best/10-best-jungle-general-levy/|title=The 10 Best Jungle Tracks of All Time, according to General Levy|work=Dummymag|date=19 March 2019}}</ref>

Crossover with drum and bass

The term "jungle" is often used as a synonym for drum and bass, particularly in the United States. More commonly, jungle is viewed as the originating point for drum and bass, with the progressive changes brought by artists in the late 1990s serving as the point of diversion (some examples being Trace & Ed Rush, LTJ Bukem, Photek, Jack Smooth, Digital, Total Science, Goldie and Optical).

Re-emergent jungle scene

A thriving underground movement producing and developing tracks in the style of the 1990s and some original (though mostly mainstream drum and bass) jungle producers have noticed this new enthusiasm for the original sound. Shy FX, for example, launched the Digital Soundboy label in 2005 to put out more jungle.

The early to mid-2000s saw a jungle revival in the emerging drum-funk subgenre, with labels such as Scientific Wax, Bassbin Records and Paradox Music pushing for a more breaks orientated sound. Technicality and Bassbin events in London were spearheading this return to more traditional elements of jungle music. 

The UK is still the spiritual home and nucleus of jungle to this day. An event called Rupture gained popularity between 2007 and the present for hosting and promoting more traditional styled jungle/drum & bass music and artists. The event and subsequent label have promoted new producers such as Forest Drive West, Tim Reaper, Dead Man's Chest and Sully, and the scene is very much thriving. As well as old heads and artists coming out of retirement, modern jungle is enjoyed by the younger generations who missed jungle the first time around.

One of the scenes originators, Congo Natty, continued to release jungle music throughout the 2000s, culminating in the 2013 album Jungle Revolution.

In 2018, Chase & Status capitalised on the current trend of jungle with their album RTRN II JUNGLE. The album was not however jungle in its pure form, and catered more towards pop music fans.

References

Further reading
 Simon Reynolds, Energy Flash: Energy Flash: A Journey Through Rave Music and Dance Culture, Picador, 1998.
 Martin James, State of Bass: Jungle the story so far, Boxtree, 1997.
 Brian Belle-Fortune, All Crews: Journeys Through Jungle/Drum and Bass Culture'', Vision, 2004.

 
1990s in music
Breakbeat
Drum and bass
Electronic dance music genres
English styles of music
Music in London